Apalachicola people may refer to:

 Apalachicola band, an association of towns on the Apalachicola River in Florida in the early 19th century
 Apalachicola Province, an association of towns on the Chattahoochee River in Alabama and Georgia (USA) that became the Lower Towns of the Muscogee Confederacy
 Apalachicola (tribal town), the namesake town of the Apalachicola Province